Savage is a 1973 American thriller-drama television pilot directed by Steven Spielberg and starring Martin Landau. It was not picked up as a series and has been referred to as a standalone made-for-television film.

Premise
A TV reporter investigates a compromising photograph of a nominee to the Supreme Court after the woman in the photograph mysteriously dies.

Cast
 Martin Landau as Paul Savage
 Barbara Bain as Gail Abbott
 Will Geer as Joel Ryker
 Paul Richards as Peter Brooks
 Michele Carey as Allison Baker
 Barry Sullivan as Judge Daniel Stern
 Louise Latham as Marian Stern
 Susan Howard as Lee Reynolds
 Dabney Coleman as Ted Seligson
 Pat Harrington Jr. as Russell
 Jack Bender as Jerry
 Victor Millan as Director

Background 
Spielberg didn't want to direct another TV film, coming off the success of the theatrical release of Duel, and was trying to get his own projects into production. William Link and Richard Levinson were attempting to get their series The Savage Report off the ground as showrunners, and pushed Universal executive Sid Sheinberg to assign Spielberg the pilot. Link later said Spielberg didn't like the script, and that after a meeting with Sheinberg where Spielberg was pressured into taking on the project, "Steve came back almost in tears. We asked, 'What happened?' We were playing dumb because we had set this up," and went on to say "Steve had made the mistake of saying that he wasn't in the Universal business, he was in the Steven Spielberg business."

Filming locations
 Los Angeles, California, USA
 Universal Studios - 100 Universal City Plaza, Universal City, California, USA

References

External links

1973 television films
1973 films
1970s thriller drama films
American thriller drama films
Films directed by Steven Spielberg
Films scored by Gil Mellé
NBC network original films
Television films as pilots
Television pilots not picked up as a series
American thriller television films
Films about journalists
American drama television films
1970s English-language films
1970s American films